Christopher "Chris" Howard Bibb (3 June 1968) is an English former professional rugby league footballer who played in the 1980s and 1990s. He played at representative level for Great Britain and Yorkshire, and at club level for Featherstone Rovers (Heritage № 616), and Wakefield Trinity (Heritage № 1054) (loan), as an occasional goal-kicking , i.e. number 1.

Background
Chris Bibb was born in Pontefract, West Riding of Yorkshire, England.

Playing career

International honours
Chris Bibb won a cap for Great Britain while at Featherstone Rovers in 1990 against New Zealand. He was part of the Great Britain Lions Tourists squad in 1990, and also played for GB Under-21s, and GB Colts teams.

County honours
Chris Bibb won caps for Yorkshire while at Featherstone Rovers; during the 1989–90 season against Lancashire, and during the 1991–92 season against Lancashire.

County Cup Final appearances
Chris Bibb played , in Featherstone Rovers' 14-20 defeat by Bradford Northern in the 1989 Yorkshire County Cup Final during the 1989–90 season at Headingley Rugby Stadium, Leeds on Sunday 5 November 1989.

Club career
Chris Bibb made his début for Featherstone Rovers on Sunday 3 November 1985, the Featherstone Rovers most tries in a match record of six tries is jointly held by; Chris Bibb, Brad Dwyer and Michael Smith, Bibb scored six tries against Keighley on 17 September 1989, he had a loan spell at Wakefield Trinity during December 1993.

Testimonial match
Chris Bibb's benefit season/testimonial match at Featherstone Rovers took place during the 1995–96 season.

Genealogical information
Chris Bibb is the son of the rugby league  who played in the 1960s and 1970s for Castleford, New Hunslet and Lock Lane ARLFC; Howard Bibb.

References

External links
!Great Britain Statistics at englandrl.co.uk (statistics currently missing due to not having appeared for both Great Britain, and England)

1968 births
Living people
English rugby league players
Featherstone Rovers players
Great Britain national rugby league team players
Great Britain under-21 national rugby league team players
Rugby league fullbacks
Rugby league players from Pontefract
Wakefield Trinity players
Yorkshire rugby league team players